St John's Church, Gateshead Fell, is in Church Road, Sheriff Hill, Gateshead, Tyne and Wear, England.  It is an active Anglican parish church in the deanery of Gateshead, the archdeaconry of Sunderland, and the diocese of Durham.  The church is recorded in the National Heritage List for England as a designated Grade II listed building.  It was a Commissioners' church, having received a grant towards its construction from the Church Building Commission.  The church stands at the highest point in Gateshead.

History

In 1809, the Enclosure Act decreed that there be a church built on Gateshead Fell and an acre of land was set aside for that purpose.  A grant of £1,000 was given towards its construction by the Church Building Commission. Designed by John Ions, the foundation stone was laid by Rev. John Collinson, at a "lofty eminence" on Sour Milk Hill, on 13 May 1824. Building continued into the next year and the church was consecrated on 30 August 1825. The total cost was £2,742. In the 1990s alterations were carried out at the rear of the church to create meeting rooms, toilets, and a kitchen.

Architecture

St John's is constructed in ashlar stone with a Welsh slate roof.  Its architectural style is Gothic Revival.  The plan of the church consists of a nave, a short chancel, and a west tower with a spire.  The tower also has diagonal buttresses and an embattled parapet.  The windows along the sides of the church are lancets.  The two-manual organ was made by Harrison and Harrison. It replaced an organ made in about 1929 by Blackett and Howden, and was installed in 2000.  The organ was formerly in St Aidan's Church, Blackhill, Consett.

See also
List of Commissioners' churches in Northeast and Northwest England

References

Church of England church buildings in Tyne and Wear
Grade II listed churches in Tyne and Wear
Churches completed in 1825
19th-century Church of England church buildings
Gothic Revival church buildings in England
Gothic Revival architecture in Tyne and Wear
Diocese of Durham
Commissioners' church buildings